Dorcadion dokhtouroffi is a species of beetle in the family Cerambycidae. It was described by Ludwig Ganglbauer in 1886. It is known from the Caucasus.

References

dokhtouroffi
Beetles described in 1886